is a Japanese actor.

Career
Show Aikawa was born in Tokushima and raised in Kagoshima. Aikawa has appeared in a number of Kiyoshi Kurosawa's films, including Eyes of the Spider, Serpent's Path, License to Live, Seance, and Pulse.

Filmography

Films
 Orugoru (1989)
 The Pale Hand (1990)
 Gokudo no Onna Tachi: Saigo no Tatakai (1990)
 Shishio Tachi no Natsu (1991)
 The Passage to Japan (1991)
 Torarete Tamaruka! (1992)
 Shishio Tachi no Saigo (1993)
 Torarete Tamaruka! 2 (1993)
 A New Love in Tokyo (1994)
 Like a Rolling Stone (1994)
 Torarete Tamaruka! 3 (1994)
 Kitanai Yatsu (1995)
 Suit Yourself or Shoot Yourself: The Heist (1995) 
 Suit Yourself or Shoot Yourself: The Escape (1995) 
 Suit Yourself or Shoot Yourself: The Loot (1995) 
 Suit Yourself or Shoot Yourself: The Reversal (1995)
 Suit Yourself or Shoot Yourself: The Nouveau Riche (1996)
 Suit Yourself or Shoot Yourself: The Hero (1996)
 Otokotachi no Kaita E (1996)
 The Revenge: A Visit from Fate (1996)
 The Revenge: A Scar That Never Fades (1996) 
 Peking Man (1997)
 Rainy Dog (1997)
 The Eel (1997)
 The Fire Within (1997)
 Serpent's Path (1997)
 Eyes of the Spider (1997)
 Blood (1998)
 License to Live (1998)
 Shiawase ni Naro ne (1998)
 Dead or Alive (1999)
 Saraba Gokudo: Dead Beat (1999)
 Ley Lines (1999)
 Dead or Alive 2: Birds (2000)
 New Battles Without Honor and Humanity (2000)
 Seance (2000)
 Otokogi (2000)
 Rush! (2001)
 Pulse (2001)
 Yomigaeri (2002)
 Muscle Heat (2002)
 Shangri-La (2002)
 True Record of an Ando Gang Side-Story: Starving Wolf's Rules (2002)
 Dead or Alive: Final (2002)
 Kisarazu Cat's Eye: Nihon Series (2003)
 Dekotora no Shu (2003)
 Gozu (2003)
 Tokyo Wankei: Destiny of Love (2004)
 Out of This World (2004)
 Dekotora no Shu 2 (2004)
 Zebraman (2004)
 Tokyo Zombie (2005)
 Tobi ga Kururi to (2005)
 The Suspect: Muroi Shinji (2005)
 Specter (2005)
 Makoto (2005)
 Dekotora no Shu 3 (2005)
 Waru: kanketsu-hen (2006)
 Taiyo no Kizu (2006)
 Waru (2006)
 Dekotora no Shu 4 (2006)
 SS (2008)
 Kurosagi (2008)
 Dekotora no Shu 5 (2008)
 Drop (2009)
 Zebraman 2: Attack on Zebra City (2010)
 Me o Tojite Giragira (2011)
 Helter Skelter (2012)
 Z Island (2015)
 Patalliro! (2019)
 What Happened to Our Nest Egg!? (2021)
 Dekotora no Shu 6 (2021)
 Haru ni Chiru (2023)

Television
 Tsubasa (1994)
 Kisarazu Cat's Eye (2002)
 Kurosagi (2006)
 Garo: Makai No Hana (Eiji Busujima) (2014)
 Sanada Maru (2016), Gotō Matabei
 Maiagare! (2022–23), Gō Kido

Video games
 Yakuza 5 (2012), Kouichi Takasugi

Dubbing
 Peter Rabbit 2: The Runaway'' (2021), Barnabas

References

External links
  
 
 

1961 births
Actors from Kagoshima Prefecture
Living people
Japanese male film actors
Japanese male television actors
20th-century Japanese male actors
21st-century Japanese male actors